Piazza del Duomo is a city square in Reggio Emilia, Italy.

Buildings around the square
Reggio Emilia Cathedral

Piazzas in Reggio Emilia